Candice Pedersen co-owned of the Olympia, Washington-based independent record label K Records from 1986 to 1999, along with Calvin Johnson of Beat Happening. In 1999, she sold her half of the label to Johnson.

Career

Pedersen was initially hired as a K Records intern in January 1986, for $20 a week and credit at Evergreen State College. Pedersen became a full partner in 1989 until selling her half of the label to Johnson in 1999. Though she managed day-to-day operations of the label, Pedersen noted in a 1992 interview that "I'm often considered my partner's secretary."

Pedersen also contributed to the label's history through organizing the citywide International Pop Underground Convention, which was an extension of a summer barbecue party she'd hosted on Steamboat Island, near Olympia. Pedersen decided to make the event citywide in 1991, and was responsible for the all-girls night which is cited as a formative moment within the Pacific Northwest's riot grrrl scene, marking the debut performance of many acts that would become nationally renown.

External links
 The Shield Around the K (2000), documentary film.

References

Evergreen State College alumni
K Records artists
Riot grrrl
Music festival founders
Music of Olympia, Washington
Living people
Women business executives
Year of birth missing (living people)
20th-century American businesspeople
20th-century American businesswomen
21st-century American women